Azatlı is a belde (town municipality) in Çiftlik ilçe (district) of Niğde Province, Turkey. The population of the Azatlı  was 4068 as of 2010. In 1973 It was declared a seat of township. 
Main economic activity is agriculture and the main crop is potato.

References

Populated places in Niğde Province
Çiftlik District